Every Little Word is the fourth studio album by American country music artist Hal Ketchum, released on May 31, 1994. It peaked at #31, better than his previous album, on Billboard's Top Country Albums chart. Of the five singles released from the album, "Stay Forever" was the most successful, peaking at # 8 on the Hot Country Songs chart. The other singles, "(Tonight We Just Might) Fall in Love Again", "That's What I Get for Losin' You", "Every Little Word", and "Veil of Tears" peaked at #20, #22, #49 and #56, respectively.

Patty Loveless sings harmony vocals on "Another Day Gone".

Critical reception

Michael McCall of AllMusic praised the album as being Ketchum's most consistent and most country album to date. He wrote that Ketchum "reconciles the thoughtfulness of his folkie heart with the verve of modern country, tapping into the directness and earthiness that ties them together.

Track listing

Production
As listed in liner notes
Produced by Allen Reynolds and Jim Rooney
Recorded and Mixed by Mark Miller
Assistant engineer: Duke Duczer
Mastered by Denny Purcell at Georgetown Masters, Nashville, TN
Digital editing by Carlos Grier

Personnel
As listed in liner notes
Sam Bacco - percussion
Richard Bennett - acoustic guitar
Gary Burr - background vocals on "Drive On"
Sam Bush - mandolin
Keith Carper - background vocals
Dan Dugmore - pedal steel guitar, Dobro
Hal Ketchum - lead vocals
Chris Leuzinger - acoustic guitar, electric guitar
Patty Loveless - background vocals on "Another Day Gone"
Scott Neubert - background vocals
Russ Pahl - Dobro on "Another Day Gone", acoustic guitar on "Drive On"
Milton Sledge - drums
Pete Wasner - piano, Wurlitzer
Bobby Wood - Hammond B-3 organ, synthesizer
Bob Wray - bass guitar

Strings by The Nashville String Machine arranged by Charles Cochran

Chart performance

References

1994 albums
Hal Ketchum albums
Albums produced by Allen Reynolds
Curb Records albums